Men Without Women is an American 1930 pre-Code drama film directed and written by John Ford, from the script by James Kevin McGuinness. The film also starred Kenneth MacKenna, Frank Albertson, and J. Farrell MacDonald. The sound version is now lost. Only a print of the "International Sound Version", held by the Museum of Modern Art, survives.

Plot

Cast

Release
The film premiered on January 31, 1930, in New York City. The production was filmed on Santa Catalina Island, California, and was released by the Fox Film Corporation.

References

External links

 
 Plot summary

1930 films
American war drama films
1930s war drama films
American black-and-white films
Films directed by John Ford
Fox Film films
Submarine films
Films with screenplays by Dudley Nichols
1930 drama films
1930s American films
1930s English-language films